Canal+ Sport 2 is a Polish-language television station broadcast by ITI Neovision and is one of nine channels available in Poland under the French Canal+ network. The channel was launched on 11 May 2015.

The Canal+ Sport 2 name already bears the channel from 13 November 2004 to 30 July 2011, which was then transformed into Canal+ Gol (until 5 April 2013), Canal+ Family 2 (until 11 May 2015) and now broadcasts as Canal+ 1.

References

External links
 

Television channels in Poland
Television channels and stations established in 2015
2015 establishments in Poland
Polish-language television stations
Mass media in Warsaw
Sports television in Poland
Canal+ Premium